Ahmet Mazhar Bozdoğan (born 1953) has been the President of the Turkish Swimming Federation since 2008. He is also a former National and record-holder swimmer, swimming coach and academician.

Early life
He was born in Adana in 1953. He studied primary school at Ata College and Cukurova College, high school at Adana College and Isık College. Ahmet Bozdogan who studied BSc at Cukurova University, is married and has two children.

Career as an athlete
He was introduced to the sport of swimming at the elementary school. He won the first champion title at National Championships which was held in 1966 in Adana, Turkey. He broke 11 national records at National Swimming Championships held in 1970. However, in such a short period of two months, he broke 36 national swimming records so his name can be found in Turkish Sports History. He was called as Golden Child, Platinum Kid, record breaking machine etc. He has been the holder of 100, 200, 400, 800, 1500 metres freestyle junior records, and 200, 400, 800, 1500 freestyle open age records during the period of 10 years from 1966 to 1976. He has represented his country at World Championships, Mediterrean Games, Balkan Championships and European Championship for 12 years in a row and has many gold medals at international competitions.

He was transferred from Adana Demirspor Club to Galatasaray Sports Club. He was also a waterpolo player at Galatasaray. He ended his career as an athlete in 1977–1978 season at Galatasaray Sports Club.

Career as an academician
He started his academic career as an instructor at Anadoluhisari Sport Academy in 1977. He coached many swimming trainers and athletes during more than 10 years. He was the member of board who is responsible of National Swim Team at Turkish Swimming Federation from 2000 to 2004. He published the first book of his series of five books about the sport of swimming in 1986.

Bozdogan is still working at Marmara University school of physical education and sports as an assistant professor at the division of swimming training.

President of the Turkish Swimming Federation
He was elected as the President of the Turkish Swimming Federation in 2008. One of his major projects was actualized in 2013: He brought Bob Bowman, the Coach of Michael Phelps, to the Turkish Swimming as a fully entitled Advisor.

References

Living people
1953 births
Turkish male swimmers
Turkish sports coaches
Academic staff of Marmara University
Çukurova University alumni
People from Adana
Sportspeople from Adana